Vincenzo Marco Antonio Nicola Constantino Candela López (born 28 September 1994) is a Colombian footballer who plays as a midfielder for Richmond Kickers in USL League One.

Early life
Candela was born in Bogotá, Colombia, but he and his family moved to Sunny Isles, Florida in the United States when he was 4 years old. His father is Italian and his mother is Colombian.

Career
Candela spent time in Europe with Real in Portugal, Alemannia Aachen in Germany, and Eupen in Belgium, before moving back to Colombia in 2016 with Atlético Huila and later Llaneros.

Candela returned to the United States when he signed with United Soccer League club Charleston Battery on 20 February 2018, following a successful open tryout appearance. He made his professional debut in the USL on 24 March 2018 in a 1–0 win over Penn FC.

On 21 May 2021, Candela signed with South Georgia Tormenta of USL League One.

Candela moved to USL League One side Richmond Kickers on 9 February 2022.

References

External links 
 

1994 births
Living people
American soccer players
Colombian footballers
Alemannia Aachen players
K.A.S. Eupen players
Atlético Huila footballers
Llaneros F.C. players
Charleston Battery players
Tormenta FC players
Richmond Kickers players
Soccer players from Florida
Association football midfielders
Footballers from Bogotá